The 2022 Prague Open (branded as the 2022 Livesport Prague Open for sponsorship reasons) was a professional women's tennis tournament played on outdoor hard courts at the TK Sparta Praha. It was the 13th (WTA and non-WTA) edition of the tournament and part of the 2022 WTA Tour, classified as a WTA 250 tournament. It took place in Prague, Czech Republic from 25 to 31 July 2022. This was the second edition of the tournament held on outdoor hard courts, as opposed to clay courts in previous editions.

Champions

Singles 

  Marie Bouzková def.  Anastasia Potapova, 6–0, 6–3.

This was Bouzková’s first WTA Tour singles title.

Doubles 

  Anastasia Potapova /  Yana Sizikova def.  Angelina Gabueva /  Anastasia Zakharova, 6–3, 6–4

Singles main draw entrants

Seeds 

† Rankings are as of 18 July 2022.

Other entrants 
The following players received wildcard entry into the singles main draw:
  Lucie Havlíčková
  Anett Kontaveit
  Linda Nosková

The following players received entry from the qualifying draw:
  Dalila Jakupović
  Barbora Palicová
  Dominika Šalková
  Oksana Selekhmeteva
  Wang Qiang
  Anastasia Zakharova

The following players received entry as lucky losers:
  Nao Hibino
  Sinja Kraus 
  Natalia Vikhlyantseva

Withdrawals 
 Before the tournament
  Ekaterina Alexandrova → replaced by  Ekaterine Gorgodze
  Belinda Bencic → replaced by  Anna Blinkova
  Lucia Bronzetti → replaced by  Nao Hibino
  Harriet Dart → replaced by  Ylena In-Albon
  Océane Dodin → replaced by  Vitalia Diatchenko
  Beatriz Haddad Maia → replaced by  Chloé Paquet
  Petra Kvitová → replaced by  Sinja Kraus
  Karolína Muchová → replaced by  Natalia Vikhlyantseva
  Donna Vekić → replaced by  Viktoriya Tomova

Doubles main draw entrants

Seeds 

† Rankings are as of 18 July 2022.

Other entrants 
The following pairs received wildcard entry into the doubles main draw:
  Lucie Havlíčková /  Linda Nosková 
  Barbora Palicová /  Dominika Šalková

The following pairs received entry using protected rankings:
  Lucie Hradecká /  Andrea Sestini Hlaváčková
  Magda Linette /  Yanina Wickmayer

The following pair received entry as alternates:
  Angelina Gabueva /  Anastasia Zakharova

Withdrawals
  Irina Bara /  Ekaterine Gorgodze → replaced by  Alena Fomina-Klotz /  Ekaterina Yashina
  Kirsten Flipkens /  Alison Van Uytvanck → replaced by  Angelina Gabueva /  Anastasia Zakharova
  Julia Lohoff /  Laura Ioana Paar → replaced by  Anastasia Dețiuc /  Miriam Kolodziejová
  Ingrid Neel /  Rosalie van der Hoek → replaced by  Ingrid Neel /  Astra Sharma

References

External links 
 Official website

2022 WTA Tour
2022 Prague Open
2022 in Czech sport
July 2022 sports events in the Czech Republic